This is an incomplete list of constituent assemblies:

References 

Constituent assemblies